Il domestico is a 1974 Italian comedy film directed by Luigi Filippo D'Amico. It was shown as part of a retrospective on Italian comedy at the 67th Venice International Film Festival.

Cast
 Lando Buzzanca as Rosario Cabaduni, called 'Sasa'
 Martine Brochard  as Rita
 Arnoldo Foà as Engineer Ambrogio Perigatti
 Femi Benussi as Lola Mandragali
 Leonora Fani as Martina Perigatti
 Paolo Carlini as  Andrea Donati
 Enzo Cannavale  as Salvatore Sperato
 Erika Blanc  as Silvana
Malisa Longo as Esther
 Silvia Monti as The Lesbian Wife
 Renzo Marignano  as The Gay Husband
 Luciano Salce  as The Film Director
 Gordon Mitchell as General Von Werner
 Antonino Faà di Bruno  as The Old Nobleman
Camillo Milli as The Prison Governor
 Nanda Primavera as The Owner of the Brothel

References

External links

1974 films
1974 comedy films
Italian comedy films
1970s Italian-language films
Films scored by Piero Umiliani
Films set in Rome
Films set in Tuscany
Films directed by Luigi Filippo D'Amico
1970s Italian films